The Hon. George Ponsonby (1773 – 5 June 1863), was an Irish politician, who served as a Junior Lord of the Treasury in the governments under Earl Grey (his brother-in-law) and Lord Melbourne from 1832 to 1834.

Early life
He was the fourth of five sons and one daughter born to William Brabazon Ponsonby by his wife, Hon. Louisa Molesworth. Among his siblings were the diplomat John Ponsonby, 1st Viscount Ponsonby, Hon. Sir William Ponsonby, a major-general in the army was killed at the Battle of Waterloo, Richard Ponsonby, who became Bishop of Killaloe and Kilfenora, Derry, and Derry and Raphoe, and Mary Ponsonby, who married the Prime Minister, Charles Grey, 2nd Earl Grey.

His mother was the fourth daughter of Richard Molesworth, 3rd Viscount Molesworth and the former Mary Jenney Ussher (daughter of the Rev. William Ussher, Archdeacon of Clonfert). His paternal grandparents were the Hon. John Ponsonby, the Speaker of the Irish House of Commons (and second son of Brabazon Ponsonby, 1st Earl of Bessborough) and the former Lady Elizabeth Cavendish (a daughter of William Cavendish, 3rd Duke of Devonshire). His aunt, Frances Ponsonby, was the wife of Cornelius O'Callaghan, 1st Baron Lismore.

Ponsonby graduated from Trinity College Dublin on 7 March 1791 at age 18.

Career
Ponsonby was a member of Lincoln's Inn in 1794, and was called in 1797.

He represented Lismore in the Irish House of Commons between 1796 and 1798.  He was then elected as a Member of Parliament at a by-election for Kilkenny County in 1806 on his father, previously the sitting member, being elevated to the peerage as 1st Baron Ponsonby of Imokilly, but a general election quickly followed when he was replaced in this seat by his younger brother Hon. Frederick Ponsonby.

Ponsonby subsequently succeeded his cousin, Henry Boyle, Viscount Boyle, and served as for Cork County from 1806 to 1812; for Youghal in County Cork from 1826 to 1832.

Personal life
On 7 April 1807, Ponsonby was married to Sarah Gledstanes (d. 1808), a daughter of John Jacob Gledstanes of Annesgift. Before her death on 18 July 1808, they were the parents of one son, who predeceased him.

On 11 June 1812, he married Diana Juliana Margaretta Bouverie (1786–1873), the youngest daughter of the former Harriet Fawkener (daughter of Sir Everard Fawkener) and Hon. Edward Bouverie, MP for Salisbury and Northampton. After Diana's father died, her mother remarried to Lord Robert Spencer (the son of Charles Spencer, 3rd Duke of Marlborough), who was considered to be Diana's actual father, and who left her the bulk of his estate. Diana and George lived at Woolbeding House in Sussex, and were the parents of one son, and one daughter:

 Robert Wentworth Ponsonby (1814–1840), who also predeceased him.
 Diana Ponsonby (d. 1893), who married Edward Howard, 1st Baron Lanerton, the fourth son of George Howard, 6th Earl of Carlisle and Lady Georgiana Dorothy (daughter of William Cavendish, 5th Duke of Devonshire).

Ponsonby died on 5 June 1863.

References

External links 
 

1773 births
1863 deaths
George Ponsonby
Irish MPs 1790–1797
Members of the Parliament of Ireland (pre-1801) for County Waterford constituencies
Members of the Parliament of the United Kingdom for County Kilkenny constituencies (1801–1922)
UK MPs 1806–1807
UK MPs 1807–1812
UK MPs 1826–1830
UK MPs 1830–1831
UK MPs 1831–1832
Younger sons of barons
Members of the Parliament of the United Kingdom for County Cork constituencies (1801–1922)